Néstor Querol Mateu (born 21 September 1987) is a Spanish footballer who plays for Cultural y Deportiva Leonesa as a left winger.

Club career
Born in El Grao de Castellón, Castellón de la Plana, Valencian Community, Querol represented CD Castellón as a youth, and made his senior debut with the reserves in the 2006–07 season, in Tercera División. In 2009, he moved to another reserve team, Real Valladolid Promesas also in the fourth tier.

On 24 June 2013, Querol returned to Castellón after a three-season spell at fellow fourth division side CF Borriol. Released the following June, he went on to represent hometown side CF San Pedro in the regional leagues and Atlético Saguntino in the fourth tier, achieving promotion to Segunda División B with the latter in 2016.

In 2017, Querol agreed to a contract with CF Badalona in the third tier. On 28 July of the following year, he moved to fellow league team CE Sabadell FC, helping in their return to Segunda División after a five-year absence in 2020.

Querol made his professional debut at the age of 32 on 19 September 2020, coming on as a second-half substitute for goalscorer Juan Hernández in a 1–2 away loss against Rayo Vallecano.

References

External links

1987 births
Living people
Sportspeople from Castellón de la Plana
Spanish footballers
Footballers from the Valencian Community
Association football wingers
Segunda División players
Segunda División B players
Tercera División players
Divisiones Regionales de Fútbol players
CD Castellón footballers
Real Valladolid Promesas players
Atlético Saguntino players
CF Badalona players
CE Sabadell FC footballers